“Creeque Alley” is an autobiographical hit single written by John Phillips and Michelle Phillips of The Mamas and the Papas in late 1966, narrating the story of how the group was formed, and its early years. The third song on the album Deliver, it peaked at #5 on the U.S. Billboard pop singles chart the week of Memorial Day 1967, becoming their last Top 10 hit. It made #9 on the UK charts, and #4 on the Australian and #1 on the Canadian charts.

Background

Title reference
The title of the song, which does not occur in the lyrics, is derived from Creque or Crequi (pronounced "creaky") Alley, home to a club in the Virgin Islands where the New Journeymen, John and Michelle Phillips' original group, spent time on vacation. The lyric "Greasin' on American Express cards" refers to that time, during which they could only make ends meet by using their credit cards, and the lyric "Duffy's good vibrations, and our imaginations, can't go on indefinitely" refers to Hugh Duffy, the owner of the club on Creeque Alley; Duffy later owned Chez Shack in Vieques, Puerto Rico.

Lyrics: Name-dropping
The Phillips' lyrics mention, directly or indirectly, many artists and bands who were part of the folk music scene at the time, including fellow band members Cass Elliot and Denny Doherty, Zal Yanovsky and John Sebastian of The Lovin' Spoonful, Roger McGuinn of The Byrds, and Barry McGuire of The New Christy Minstrels. Several locations important to the band's story are mentioned, such as the Night Owl Cafe in Greenwich Village. Michelle Phillips is referred to in the lyrics by her nickname Michi ("John and Michi were getting kind of itchy, just to leave the folk music behind"). John Phillips said that he wrote the song to tell their producer Lou Adler "who was who" in the band's history.

Lyrics: Turn-around
The line that ends the first three verses is "And no one's getting fat, except Mama Cass". In the fourth verse, with the story of the genesis of The Mamas and the Papas nearing its denouement, Phillips changes the concluding line to "And everybody's getting fat except Mama Cass," with the word fat assuming the meaning of prosperous, an allusion to the notion that the success that Cass' professional associates and friends recently had achieved still eluded Cass. The final lyric line "And California dreamin' is becoming a reality" is an apparent reference to their hit song "California Dreamin'", and marks the point at which the group achieved its breakthrough, leaving behind the lifestyle described in the rest of the song.

Versions
There are three mixes of the song, all with audible differences. The original single version includes a horn section that is not heard on the album versions and ends with Doherty singing an extra "becoming a reality." The mix that appears on the mono pressings of The Mamas and the Papas Deliver omits the horns completely. It contains the repeat of "becoming a reality" but, unlike on the single, Elliot can be heard singing in harmony with Doherty. The song as heard on stereo copies of The Mamas and the Papas Deliver, as well as on almost all Mamas and Papas compilations, also omits the horns, and the extra "becoming a reality" is not heard either, save for the "-ty" syllable of "reality" (sung by both Doherty and Elliot.) The middle flute solo is mixed differently in each version.

Reception
Cash Box called the single a "driving, pulsing, groovin’ ditty."

Chart history

Weekly charts

Year-end charts

References

External links
creequealley.com — a line by line analysis of Creeque Alley by The Mamas and The Papas

Everything 2 page
ADVANCE LYRICS FOR NEW SONG

The Mamas and the Papas songs
1967 songs
Songs written by John Phillips (musician)
Song recordings produced by Lou Adler
Songs written by Michelle Phillips
Dunhill Records singles
1967 singles
Songs based on actual events
RPM Top Singles number-one singles